The women's 4 × 200 metres relay at the 2015 IAAF World Relays was held at the Thomas Robinson Stadium on 2 May.

Records
Prior to the competition, the records were as follows:

Schedule

Results

Final
The final was started at 21:47.

References

4 x 200 metres relay
4 × 200 metres relay
2015 in women's athletics